Oskari Mantere (18 September 1874 – 9 December 1942) was a Finnish politician from the National Progressive Party who served as Prime Minister of Finland from December 1928 to August 1929. He led a minority government.

Cabinets
 Mantere Cabinet

References

1874 births
1942 deaths
People from Hausjärvi
People from Häme Province (Grand Duchy of Finland)
National Progressive Party (Finland) politicians
Prime Ministers of Finland
Ministers of Education of Finland
Members of the Parliament of Finland (1919–22)
Members of the Parliament of Finland (1922–24)
Members of the Parliament of Finland (1924–27)
Members of the Parliament of Finland (1927–29)
Members of the Parliament of Finland (1929–30)
Members of the Parliament of Finland (1930–33)
Members of the Parliament of Finland (1933–36)
Members of the Parliament of Finland (1936–39)
University of Helsinki alumni
Finnish educational theorists